Espionage was a pop band formed in 1983 and dissolved in 1985. The band released two albums, their self-titled debut album in 1983 and E S P in 1985. The band is best known for their 1983 song The Sound of Breaking Hearts which had a music video. Their debut album was produced by Roy Thomas Baker.

Discography
Espionage 1983 (A&M Records)

ESP 1985 (Elektra Records)

References

External links
 Discography on Discogs

Musical groups established in 1983
Musical groups disestablished in 1985